Thomas F. Yewcic (born September 30, 1954) was a Democratic member of the Pennsylvania House of Representatives, representing the 72nd District from 1993 until 2008.  He and his wife live in Jackson Township and have 2 children. He retired prior to the 2008 election and was succeeded by Democrat Frank Burns.

References

External links
Pennsylvania House of Representatives -  Thomas F. Yewcic official PA House website
 official Party website
Biography, voting record, and interest group ratings at Project Vote Smart

1954 births
Living people
Democratic Party members of the Pennsylvania House of Representatives
People from Cambria County, Pennsylvania
University of Pittsburgh alumni
Pittsburgh Panthers football players